The Adoption and Children Act 2002 is a law that allows unmarried or married people and same-sex couples in England and Wales to adopt children. The reforms introduced in the Act were based on a comprehensive review of adoption and were described by The Guardian as "the most radical overhaul of adoption legislation for almost 30 years".

The Act also allows for the introduction of special guardianship, a legal status that allows for a child to be cared for by a person with rights similar to a traditional legal guardian, but without a requirement for absolute legal separation from the child's birth parents. Special guardianship provisions were passed into law by statutory instrument in 2005 and came into force in 2006.

The Act also introduced a procedure to allow people to trace relatives placed for adoption through an intermediary if both persons are over 18.

An equivalent Act was passed in Scotland in 2007.

See also 
 Same-sex adoption in the United Kingdom

References 

United Kingdom Acts of Parliament 2002
Adoption in the United Kingdom
LGBT law in the United Kingdom